Sigfrid Heyner (20 July 1909 – 9 November 1995) was a Swedish swimmer. He competed in the men's 200 metre breaststroke at the 1932 Summer Olympics.

References

External links
 

1909 births
1995 deaths
Olympic swimmers of Sweden
Swimmers at the 1932 Summer Olympics
Swimmers from Stockholm
Swedish male breaststroke swimmers